The Malta Historical Society is a society devoted to the history of Malta. It was founded in 1950 after a public appeal by professor Arturo Bonnici in Lehen is-Sewwa, the Catholic Action newspaper. Bonnici was subsequently elected the first president. Other past presidents include Seraphim Zarb, Vincent Borg, Godfrey Wettinger, Albert Ganado, Stanley Fiorini, Mario Buhagiar, Giovanni Bonello, Roger Ellul Micallef and Theresa Vella.

Godfrey Wettinger was also a founding member.

Its journal is Melita Historica.

References 

1950 establishments in Malta
History of Malta
Learned societies of Malta